Warren Row is a village in Berkshire, England, and part of the civil parish of Hurley. It contains a green tin tabernacle church.

History 
Warren Row was formed by a few group of cottages on the boundaries of three estates - Hall Place, Rosehill and Park Place. St Paul's Mission, the tin tabernacle church, was built in 1894 and was purchased for just over £100. During World War II the local chalk pits were used as an underground factory. 

Between 1958 and 1961 a secret bunker was built in the chalk mines as the village had been identified as the location for a Regional Seat of Government in case of nuclear attack on London. The bunker was discovered in 1963 by a few anti-nuclear protesters, who referred to themselves as 'Spies for Peace'. It was sold in 1988, being bought by a data storage company and later also used to store wines.

References

Villages in Berkshire
Hurley, Berkshire